A half-moon cookie in Filipino cuisine is a semicircle- or crescent-shaped butter cookie. It has a soft crumbly texture and a sweet flavor with a salty aftertaste.

See also
 Roscas
 Camachile cookie
 Paciencia cookie
 List of cookies

References 

Philippine cuisine
Cookies